Striver (Fen-Dou-Zhe, or 奋斗者 in Chinese) bathyscaphe is a type of deep-submergence vehicle built in the People's Republic of China (PRC). It was built by China State Shipbuilding Corporation (CSSC). It can accommodate three crew members,and is designed to reach depths of more than 10,000 meters. Striver is equipped with two mechanical arms, seven underwater cameras, seven sonars, hydraulic drills, and other scientific devices.

Design 
In comparison to the earlier Deep Sea Warrior bathyscaphe that was 95% domestically built, Striver is 96.5% domestic, but can dive more than twice as deep. A significant portion of the onboard equipment has to be allocated to support the dive. In comparison to the ten-hour endurance of Deep Sea Warrior, Striver last for six hours. Striver can dive and surface much faster,and its crew compartment is built of titanium alloy Ti62A, specially developed for use on Striver, and a new welding method. It is equipped with cameras made by the Norwegian manufacturer Imenco. The designer is Ye Cong (叶聪).The mechanical arms of Striver were developed by Shenyang Institute of Automation, and each is capable of handling 60 kg of weight. The motherships of the Striver bathyscaphe are the same ones used for Deep Sea Warrior bathyscaphe: Chinese research vessel Explorer 1(Tan-Suo 1, or 探索一号 in Chinese) and Explorer 2.

Specification 

Specifications are:
Weight: 36 ton
Crew: 3
Payload: 240 kg
Endurance: 6 hours

See also

DSV Limiting Factor – Crewed deep-submergence vehicle

References

Research submarines of China